Ekta Shakti Party (United Force Party) was a regional political party in Haryana, India. Founded in 2004. The party president was Virender Verma, a former government employee. Verma is the son of Shiv Ram Verma, who was a member of the erstwhile Bharatiya Jana Sangh. Verma bases his political movement amongst a people called Ror in the Indian caste system. Verma claims that the Rors are related to the Marathas, and using this Maratha identity he was initially able to win some support from the community. Verma builds his political discourse on the accusation that northern Haryana has been discriminated against by politicians from western Haryana.

Verma was accused of having Organized Party activities whilst still in Government service that is Illegal.

In the 2004 Lok Sabha elections the party fielded three candidates from northern Haryana. They got 13022, 82430 and 31202 votes respectively.

In the 2009 Lok Sabha election the party fielded candidates from Karnal (Lok Sabha constituency) seat Maratha Virender Verma (BSP)got around 228352 votes. He was in 2nd position after Congress candidate Arvind Sharma

Later merged to Indian National Congress

References

External links
Ekta Shaktis election result 2004
2009 election in karnal lok sabha
Maratha Virender Verma in election result 2009
MARATHA IN HARYANA

Defunct political parties in Haryana
2004 establishments in Haryana
Political parties established in 2004